Renegade Mountain (also known simply as Renegade) is an unincorporated community and a resort community in Cumberland County, Tennessee, located on the Cumberland Plateau.
Renegade Mountain bills itself as "Quite possibly the best place to live in Tennessee". Renegade Mountain has a full-time population of around 40 people according to its website.

Amenities
There is no mail delivery service but residents are given a free postal box in Crab Orchard, there is no school bus stop or trash pick-up in the Resort however they are both nearby at the bottom of the mountain. There was a golf course and a sports park which included a pool, tennis courts and a small playground and picnic area, all of which have fallen into disrepair.

Utilities
Electric, high speed internet, telephone, cell phone, cable and satellite services are available. Water is provided Crab Orchard Utility District.

Renegade Mountain Resort murders
On September 12, 2013 four people were found shot to death in a car, three were teenagers and one was 22 years old.

References

Unincorporated communities in Cumberland County, Tennessee
Unincorporated communities in Tennessee